Thomas Lange (1829–1887) was a Danish novelist.

Biography
Lange was born in Copenhagen. He studied theology, but was not ordained, and afterwards devoted himself to literature. His first writings were published anonymously, and attracted little attention. It was not until Eventyets Land (1863) appeared that he was fitly appreciated. Later works gave him a place not much inferior to that of Goldschmidt in Danish literature.

Works
Eventyets Land (1863)
Aaen og Havet (1870)
Romantiske Skildringer (Romantic Descriptions, 1872), his masterpiece
De lyse Nætter (1875)
Et Symposion (1877)
Nyt Liv (1879)
En Kjærlighedshistorie (1882)

References

1829 births
1887 deaths
19th-century Danish novelists
Writers from Copenhagen
Danish male novelists
19th-century male writers